Clement Ebiowo Krobakpo (born 1 July 1994) is a Nigerian badminton player. He won two bronze medals at the 2015 African Games in the men's singles and team events. Krobakpo also competed at the 2019 African Games, clinched the mixed team gold.

Achievements

All-African Games 
Men's singles

African Championships 
Men's singles

BWF International Challenge/Series (1 title) 
Mixed doubles

  BWF International Challenge tournament
  BWF International Series tournament
  BWF Future Series tournament

References

External links 
 

1994 births
Living people
Nigerian male badminton players
Competitors at the 2015 African Games
Competitors at the 2019 African Games
African Games gold medalists for Nigeria
African Games bronze medalists for Nigeria
African Games medalists in badminton
21st-century Nigerian people